Lake Edward Township (or Lake Edwards Township) is a township in Crow Wing County, Minnesota, United States. The population was 1,995 at the 2000 census.

The unincorporated community of Merrifield is located within Lake Edward Township.

Geography

Demographics
As of the census of 2000, there were 1,995 people, 785 households, and 595 families residing in the township. The racial makeup of the township was 98.75% White, 0.15% African American, 0.20% Native American, 0.05% Asian, 0.20% from other races, and 0.65% from two or more races. Hispanic or Latino of any race were 0.55% of the population.

There were 785 households, out of which 30.3% had children under the age of 18 living with them, 67.9% were married couples living together, 4.6% had a female householder with no husband present, and 24.1% were non-families. 19.4% of all households were made up of individuals, and 7.4% had someone living alone who was 65 years of age or older.  The average household size was 2.54 and the average family size was 2.91.

In the township the population was spread out, with 24.2% under the age of 18, 5.9% from 18 to 24, 25.6% from 25 to 44, 29.1% from 45 to 64, and 15.2% who were 65 years of age or older.  The median age was 42 years. For every 100 females, there were 111.3 males.  For every 100 females age 18 and over, there were 108.7 males.

The median income for a household in the township was $43,274, and the median income for a family was $46,174. Males had a median income of $34,875 versus $21,250 for females. The per capita income for the township was $19,714.  About 7.6% of families and 8.9% of the population were below the poverty line, including 10.9% of those under age 18 and 18.8% of those age 65 or over.

References

Brainerd, Minnesota micropolitan area
Townships in Crow Wing County, Minnesota
Townships in Minnesota